The 2019 Austrian motorcycle Grand Prix was the eleventh round of the 2019 MotoGP season. It was held at the Red Bull Ring in Spielberg on 11 August 2019.

Classification

MotoGP

Moto2

Moto3

MotoE

All bikes manufactured by Energica.

Championship standings after the race

MotoGP

Moto2

Moto3

MotoE

Notes

References

External links

Austrian
Motorcycle Grand Prix
Austrian motorcycle Grand Prix
Austrian motorcycle Grand Prix